Bluebush can refer to:

Plants
 Acacia brachybotrya (grey wattle) of Australia
 Acacia caesiella (tableland wattle) of Australia
 Chenopodium (goosefoot) species in Australia
 Diospyros lycioides (bushveld bluebush) of Africa
 Maireana, the bluebushes proper

Other
 Bluebush Creek, Western Australia
 Bluebush Parish, Windeyer County, New South Wales